The droungarios of the Fleet (droungarios tou ploïmou/tōn ploïmōn; after the 11th century δρουγγάριος τοῦ στόλου, droungarios tou stolou), sometimes anglicized as Drungary of the Fleet, was the commander of the Imperial Fleet (βασιλικὸς στόλος, basilikos stolos, or βασιλικὸν πλόϊμον, basilikon ploïmon), the central division of the Byzantine navy stationed at the capital of Constantinople, as opposed to the provincial (thematic) fleets. From the late 11th century, when the Byzantine fleets were amalgamated into a single force under the megas doux, the post, now known as the Grand droungarios of the Fleet (μέγας δρουγγάριος τοῦ στόλου, megas droungarios tou stolou), became the second-in-command of the megas doux and continued in this role until the end of the Byzantine Empire.

Background and history of the office

In response to the Muslim conquests, some time in the latter half of the 7th century, the bulk of the Byzantine navy was formed into a single command, the great fleet of the Karabisianoi ("the Ships' Men"), commanded, like the land themes that appeared around the same time, by a stratēgos (stratēgos tōn karabōn/karabisianōn, "general of the ships/ships' men"). The Karabisianoi, however, proved inadequate and were replaced in the early 8th century by a more complex system composed of three elements, which, with minor alterations, survived until the 11th century: a central fleet based at Constantinople; a few regional naval commands, namely the maritime Theme of the Cibyrrhaeots and a number of independent commands under a droungarios, which eventually evolved into the maritime themes of the Aegean Sea and of Samos in the course of the 9th century; and a greater number of local squadrons in the land themes, charged with purely defensive and police tasks and subordinate to the local thematic governors.

A fleet was based in Constantinople at least since the 7th century, and indeed played a central role in the repulsion of the two Arab sieges of Constantinople in 674–678 and 717–718, but the exact date of the establishment of the Imperial Fleet (βασιλικὸς στόλος, basilikos stolos, or βασιλικὸν πλόϊμον, basilikon ploïmon) as a distinct command is unclear. The Irish historian J. B. Bury, followed by the French Byzaninist Rodolphe Guilland, considered it "not improbable" that the Imperial Fleet existed as a subordinate command under the stratēgos tōn karabisianōn already in the 7th century. From that point on, the Imperial Fleet formed the main naval reserve force and provided the core of various expeditionary fleets.

In the Taktikon Uspensky, the droungarios of the Fleet is positioned relatively lowly in the hierarchy, coming after all the senior military and civilian officials, placed between the prōtostratōr and the ek prosōpou of the themes. By the time of the 899 Klētorologion of Philotheos, however, he had risen considerably in importance, being placed variously either immediately before or after the logothetēs tou dromou and in the 35th or 38th position of the overall hierarchy, ahead of the domestikoi of the guard regiments (tagmata) of the Hikanatoi and the Noumeroi, as well as of the various chartoularioi (civil department heads). Indeed, he was not classed with the other military commanders, whether of the themes or of the tagmata, but in the special class of military officials, the stratarchai, where he is listed second, after the hetaireiarchēs, the commander of the imperial bodyguard. This rise coincided with the revival in the Byzantine navy's fortunes, begun under Michael III but carried to fruition under the first two emperors of the Macedonian dynasty, Basil I the Macedonian and Leo VI the Wise.

The Klētorologion further lists his subordinate officials as comprising his deputy or topotērētēs (τοποτηρητής), the secretary or chartoularios (χαρτουλάριος), the head messenger or prōtomandatōr and the other messengers (μανδάτορες, mandatores), the commanders of squadrons or komētes (κόμητες; sing. κόμης, komēs), and the centurions of the individual ships (κένταρχοι, kentarchoi; sing. κένταρχος, kentarchos). In addition, there was a komēs tēs hetaireias (κόμης τῆς ἑταιρείας), whose function is disputed: according to Bury, he probably commanded the foreign mercenaries, especially Rus' or Scandinavians, who served as marines, but the Greek historian Nicolas Oikonomides considered him the head of the droungarios personal guard. According to the De Ceremoniis of Emperor Constantine VII, he also had a role in imperial ceremonies, often in association with the droungarios tēs viglēs. Typical dignities associated with the post where the senior ranks of prōtospatharios, patrikios, and anthypatos.

The office reached its heyday during the 10th century, when several important personages held it, most notably Emperor Romanos I Lekapenos, who used it as a springboard to the throne. The office continued in the 11th century, but as the fleet was no longer very active, the droungarios chiefly commanded the Constantinopolitan fleet instead of leading expeditions; the title was now usually referred to as droungarios tou stolou (δρουγγάριος τοῦ στόλου). With the accession of Alexios I Komnenos a major reorganization of the navy took place. With the great naval themes having suffered a long decline as military formations, Alexios gathered the remnants of the provincial fleets and amalgamated them with the Imperial Fleet into a single force based in Constantinople, and placed it under the command of the megas doux.

The post of the droungarios of the Fleet remained in existence, now with the addition of the prefix megas ("grand"). According to the mid-14th century Book of Offices of Pseudo-Kodinos, he "has the same relation to the megas doux as the megas droungarios tēs viglēs had to the megas domestikos", i.e., he was the second in command. He was apparently in charge of subordinate droungarioi, who however were of very lowly rank and are rarely mentioned in the sources. Although reduced in significance in comparison to its heyday, the megas droungarios tou stolou remained important, ranking 32nd in the overall hierarchy in the Book of Offices. Pseudo-Kodinos gives his ceremonial costume at the time as follows: a gold-embroidered skiadion hat, a plain silk kabbadion kaftan, and a skaranikon (domed hat) covered in golden and lemon-yellow silk and decorated with gold wire and images of the emperor in front and rear, respectively depicted enthroned and on horseback. He bore no staff of office (dikanikion).

List of known holders 
Note: Uncertain entries are marked in italics.

A number of holders are known only by their surviving seals of office, and can only approximately be dated:

References

Sources
 
 
 
 
 
 
 
 
 
 

Byzantine military offices
Byzantine admirals
Naval ranks
Lists of office-holders in the Byzantine Empire
Lists of admirals